Idiostatus is a genus of insects in the family Tettigoniidae which are native to western North America.

The lateral lobes of the prothorax are as deep as they are long.

Species
These 28 species belong to the genus Idiostatus:

 Idiostatus aberrans Rentz, 1973 i c g
 Idiostatus aequalis (Scudder, 1899) i c g b (uniform shieldback)
 Idiostatus apollo Rentz, 1973 i c g b (Apollo shieldback)
 Idiostatus bechteli Rentz, 1973 i c g
 Idiostatus bilineatus (Thomas, 1875) i
 Idiostatus birchimi Rentz, 1973 i c g
 Idiostatus californicus Pictet, 1888 i c g b (Pictet's shieldback)
 Idiostatus callimerus Rehn and Hebard, 1920 i c g (Pretty-thigh shieldback)
 Idiostatus chewaucan Rentz and Lightfoot, 1976 i c g
 Idiostatus elegans Caudell, 1907 i c g
 Idiostatus fuscopunctatus (Scudder, 1899) i c g
 Idiostatus fuscus Caudell, 1934 i c g b
 Idiostatus goedeni Rentz, 1978 i c g
 Idiostatus gurneyi Rentz, 1973 i c g b (Gurney's shieldback)
 Idiostatus hermannii (Thomas, C., 1875) c g b (Hermann's shieldback)
 Idiostatus inermis (Scudder, 1899) i c g
 Idiostatus inermoides Rentz, 1973 i c g (Humboldt shieldback)
 Idiostatus inyo Rehn and Hebard, 1920 i c g
 Idiostatus kathleenae Rentz, 1973 i c g (Pinnacles shieldback)
 Idiostatus magnificus Hebard, 1934 i c g
 Idiostatus major Caudell, 1934 i c g
 Idiostatus martinellii Rentz, 1973 i c g
 Idiostatus middlekauffi Rentz, 1973 i c g (Middlekauff's shieldback)
 Idiostatus rehni Caudell, 1907 i c g (Rehn's shieldback)
 Idiostatus sinuata (Scudder, 1899) i
 Idiostatus variegatus Caudell, 1907 i c g b (variegated shield-back)
 Idiostatus viridis Rentz, 1973 i c g
 Idiostatus wymorei Caudell, 1934 i c g

Data sources: i = ITIS, c = Catalogue of Life, g = GBIF, b = Bugguide.net

References 

Tettigoniinae
Tettigoniidae genera
Taxonomy articles created by Polbot